Aminata Fall (born 13 August 1991) is a Senegalese basketball player for İstanbul Üniversitesi SK and the Senegalese national team.

She participated at the 2018 FIBA Women's Basketball World Cup.

Southern Nazarene statistics 
Source

References

External links

1991 births
Living people
Senegalese expatriate basketball people in Australia
Senegalese expatriate basketball people in the United States
Senegalese expatriate basketball people in Montenegro
Centers (basketball)
Senegalese expatriate basketball people in Turkey
Senegalese expatriate basketball people in Belgium
Senegalese expatriate basketball people in Switzerland
Senegalese women's basketball players
Southern Nazarene Crimson Storm women's basketball players